Alison La Placa (born December 16, 1959) is an American actress best known for the role of acid-tongued yuppie Linda Phillips in the Fox sitcoms Duet and its spin-off Open House, both of which aired in the late 1980s.

Biography

Early life and career
La Placa is a graduate of Stevenson High School in Lincolnshire, Illinois, a suburb of Chicago. She attended Illinois Wesleyan University, where she majored in drama. She performed in a circus show, Circus Fantastic, at Marriott's Great America, now Six Flags Great America.

Before moving to Los Angeles La Placa worked as a cocktail waitress at Chicago's Palmer House on Michigan Ave.

Shortly after moving to Hollywood, La Placa landed the part of Elyse in television sitcom version of Barry Levinson's film Diner. That pilot did not get picked up, and soon thereafter La Placa got a part in the made-for-TV movie Listen to Your Heart (1983).

Later career
The following year La Placa earned a regular spot on Suzanne Pleshette Is Maggie Briggs (1984). She had a small part in Fletch (1985) and she subsequently played Linda Phillips on the series Duet (from 1987 to 1989) and Open House (from 1989 to 1990). LaPlaca also played opposite Kirstie Alley in the 1990 movie Madhouse, with co-star John Larroquette.

La Placa has guest-starred on series including ER, Cheers, Family Ties, Desperate Housewives, and Friends (as Rachel's boss, Joanna). She was a regular on Stat (1991), The Jackie Thomas Show (1992), Tom (1994), and the NBC sitcom The John Larroquette Show (from 1994 to 1996). La Placa has also guest-starred on animated series such as Johnny Bravo.

She has been married to TV actor/director Philip Charles MacKenzie (her costar on Open House) since 1992.

She also played the character of Andrea in the TV series Boston Legal in two episodes in season 4 ("Glow in the Dark" and "Rescue Me"). She also appeared in Malcolm in the Middle as Barbara in the episode "Convention" and in a recurring role on ’Til Death as Beth, Joy's coworker.

Filmography

Film

Television

References

External links
 
 

Living people
American film actresses
American musical theatre actresses
American television actresses
American voice actresses
20th-century American actresses
21st-century American actresses
Illinois Wesleyan University alumni
1959 births